Fairfield House may refer to:
 Fairfield House, Bath in Newbridge, Bath, England and the Home in Exile of Emperor Haile Selassie
 Fairfield House, Nelson, New Zealand
 Fairfield House at Uppingham School, England

See also
Fairfield (Berryville, Virginia), a historic house listed on the National Register of Historic Places